Gledson is a name. It may refer to:

 David Gledson (1877-1949), Australian accountant and member of the Queensland Legislative Assembly
 Gledson (footballer, born 1979), Gledson da Silva Menezes, Brazilian football defender
 Glédson (footballer, born 1983), Glédson Ribeiro dos Santos, Brazilian football goalkeeper